is a railway station on the Jōetsu Line in the town of Yuzawa, Minamiuonuma District, Niigata Prefecture, Japan, operated by the East Japan Railway Company (JR East).

Lines

Station layout
The station has a one ground-level island platform and one side platform connected by a footbridge. The station is unattended.

Platforms

History
Echigo-Nakazato Station opened on 1 September 1931. A new station building was completed in 1980. Upon the privatization of the Japanese National Railways (JNR) on 1 April 1987, it came under the control of JR East.

Surrounding area
Echigo-Nakazato Ski Resort

See also
 List of railway stations in Japan

External links

 JR East station information 

Railway stations in Niigata Prefecture
Stations of East Japan Railway Company
Railway stations in Japan opened in 1931
Yuzawa, Niigata